McHenry East High School was a 4-year public high school in McHenry, Illinois, United States, which served 9th-12th grade students until the 2021–2022 school year. Since then, the building is being used to serve only 9th grade students and was renamed to McHenry High School - Freshman Campus after minor renovations were completed to the building in 2020–21.

Notable alumni 

 Robert Tonyan, professional American football player for the Chicago Bears.
 Thomas Roark, professional American football player, known throughout McHenry, Illinois for sprinting head-long into a wall and shattering his arm.
 Chuck Hiller, former Major League Baseball Player

References

External links
Official site

Schools in McHenry County, Illinois
Public high schools in Illinois
McHenry, Illinois